Crnotince is a village in the municipality of Preševo, Serbia. According to the 2002 census, the village has a population of 1454 people. Of these, 1.445 (99,38 %) were ethnic Albanians, and 4 (0,27 %) others.

References

Populated places in Pčinja District
Albanian communities in Serbia